Amethyst Rock Star is the debut solo studio album by Saul Williams. It was released by American Recordings in 2001. It peaked at number 135 on the French Albums Chart.

Critical reception

Steve Kurutz of AllMusic gave the album 1.5 stars out of 5, saying: "Some of the language is downright laughable (see the trite themes of 'Fearless' for example) in any context, and the rest is mediocre at best." Kitty Empire of NME gave the album 3.5 stars out of 5, calling it "an ambitious collision of rock, hip-hop and spoken word, all united by a refusal to conform to the conventions of any of them."

Track listing

Personnel
Credits adapted from liner notes.

Musicians
 Saul Williams – vocals, co–production, arrangement
 Rick Rubin – production
 Musa Bailey – additional production (2), additional programming, turntables
 Krust – additional production (9)
 Esthero – vocals (4)
 Chad Smith – drums (7)
 Jerome Jordan – guitar, backing vocals
 Maximina Juson – bass guitar
 Maryam Blacksher – viola
 Nioka Workman – cello
 Kwame Brandt-Pierce – keyboards
 Chris Eddleton – drums
 Greg Gordon – recording
 Russell Elevado – recording, mixing

Technical personnel
 Marcia Jones – visual art
 Michael Crivello – visual art
 Brandy Flower – graphic design
 Michele Miller – photography
 B+ – photography
 Mei Lei – journals
 Dorothy E. Wilcox – penpal
 Lindsay Chase – coordination

Charts

References

External links
 
 

2001 debut albums
Saul Williams albums
Albums produced by Rick Rubin
American Recordings (record label) albums